Chang (also Romanized as Chenag) is a village in Dezhgan Rural District, in the Central District of Bandar Lengeh County, Hormozgan Province, Iran. At the 2006 census, its population was 144, in 30 families.

References 

Populated places in Bandar Lengeh County